Gordon Frederick Walters (24 September 1919 – 5 November 1995) was a Wellington-born artist and graphic designer who is significant to New Zealand culture due to his representation of New Zealand in his Modern Abstract artworks.

Education 
Gordon Walters was born and raised in Wellington, where he went to Miramar South School and Rongotai College. From 1935 to 1939 he studied as a commercial artist at Wellington Technical College under Frederick V. Ellis.

Early influence and experiences 
Walters applied to join the army during World War II but was turned down due to medical problems. He took up a job in the Ministry of Supply doing illustrations. Walters traveled to Australia in 1946 and then visited photographer and painter Theo Schoon in South Canterbury, who was photographing Māori rock art at Opihi River. This visit was central to Walters work as he began using Māori cultural themes in his painting. In 1950 Walters moved to Europe where he became influenced by Piet Mondrian, Victor Vasarely and Auguste Herbin. On his return to New Zealand in 1953, Walters began to fuse abstract modernism with traditional Māori art.

The koru series 
Walters' designs progressed and New Zealand shapes and ideas were important themes. The geometric spiral form of the koru began appearing consistently in his work from the late 1950s. His design straightened the stem of the koru in a way not seen in customary Māori contexts.  Walters stated “My work is an investigation of positive/ negative relationships within a deliberately limited range of forms; the forms I use have no descriptive value in themselves and are used solely to demonstrate relations. I believe that dynamic relations are most clearly expressed by the repetition of a few simple elements.” From the mid-1980s, Walters was accused of exploitative appropriation of Māori art by several critics, both Māori and Pākehā (European New Zealander).

Walters' best known work, Maheno, was painted in 1981 and formed part of an ongoing koru series. The painting brings both Māori and European ideas together through geometric abstraction and Māori culture expressed through both image and language with the koru and the title 'Maheno' in Māori.  Koru is a Māori word that has now become part of mainstream New Zealand English, describing the growing tip of a fern frond.

Personal life
Walters became a fulltime artist in 1966 and in 1971 was awarded a QEII Fellowship. Recognised for his precise geometric abstraction, he moved to Christchurch in 1976.

Walters married Margaret Orbell (1934–2006), a scholar of Māori literature, in 1963.

Gordon Walters died on 5 November, 1995, aged 76.

References

External links
Works by Gordon Walters at Te Papa
Works by Gordon Walters at the Auckland Art Gallery
Victoria University: Gordon Walters Prints + Design
Christchurch Art Gallery: Infosheet on Untitled, 1985 (pdf)
Christchurch Art Gallery: Infosheet on Untitled (Koru Series), 1981 (pdf)

1919 births
1995 deaths
New Zealand painters
Modern painters
People educated at Rongotai College